Ahmed Badawi Sayyid Ahmed (Arabic: أحمد بدوي سيد أحمد) was an Egyptian Field Marshal (Mushir) and the Chief of the General Staff of the Armed Forces.

Early life
Ahmed Badawy was born in the coastal city of Alexandria in 1927. He studied commerce at Alexandria University where he obtained his bachelor's degree, he then traveled to Moscow on a scholarship to the M. V. Frunze Military Academy.

Career
He became a senior lecturer at the military academy in 1958 but then he was fired from the military service in 1967. 
President Anwar El-Sadat then asked him to return to military service at the same time as he became a lecturer at Ain Shams University. As a brigadier general, he commanded the 7th Infantry Division during the Yom Kippur War, and after the Third Army became encircled, was placed in command of the cut-off force. The isolated part of the army was made up of the 7th and 19th Infantry Divisions, plus two independent armoured brigades, on the east bank, and a mixture of units in Suez city itself.

He became the commander of the Training Institute of the Armed Forces and was then promoted to become the Chief of the General Staff of the Egyptian Armed Forces.

On 14 May 1980, Anwar El-Sadat made him the Minister of Defence and Military Production.

Death
A few months after becoming in charge of the ministry of defence, Ahmed Badawy died, along with 13 senior officers, in a helicopter crash on 2 March 1981.

References

External links 
 https://search.wikileaks.org/plusd/cables/1976CAIRO16857_b.html - Third Army commander Maj Gen Ahmad Badawi speaks to State Department officials, 7 December 1976.

1927 births
1981 deaths
Field marshals of Egypt
Defence Ministers of Egypt
Alexandria University alumni
Academic staff of Ain Shams University
Egyptian Military Academy alumni
Chiefs of the General Staff (Egypt)
Victims of aviation accidents or incidents in 1981
Victims of aviation accidents or incidents in Egypt